Hamburg-Nord is an electoral constituency (German: Wahlkreis) represented in the Bundestag. It elects one member via first-past-the-post voting. Under the current constituency numbering system, it is designated as constituency 21. It is located in northern Hamburg, comprising most of the Hamburg-Nord borough and the northern part of the Wandsbek borough.

Hamburg-Nord was created for the 1980 federal election. Since 2021, it has been represented by Dorothee Martin of the Social Democratic Party (SPD).

Geography
Hamburg-Nord is located in northern Hamburg. As of the 2021 federal election, it comprises the entirety of the Hamburg-Nord borough with the exception of the quarters of Barmbek-Nord, Barmbek-Süd, Dulsberg, Hohenfelde, and Uhlenhorst. It also contains the quarters of Bergstedt, Duvenstedt, Hummelsbüttel, Lemsahl-Mellingstedt, Poppenbüttel, Sasel, Wellingsbüttel and Wohldorf-Ohlstedt from the Wandsbek borough.

History
Hamburg-Nord was created in 1980 and contained parts of the abolished constituencies of Hamburg-Nord I and Hamburg-Nord II. Through the 1998 election, it was constituency number 15 in the numbering system. From 2002 through 2009, it was constituency 22; since 2013, it has been constituency 21. Its borders have not changed since its creation.

Members
The constituency was held by the Social Democratic Party (SPD) from its creation in 1980 until 1987, during which time it was represented by Hans Apel. It was won by the Christian Democratic Union (CDU) in 1987, and represented by Dirk Fischer. In 1998, it was won by the SPD's Anke Hartnagel. She was succeeded by Christian Carstensen in 2005. Former member Fischer won the constituency again in 2009. He was succeeded by Christoph Ploß in the 2017 election. Dorothee Martin regained it for the SPD in 2021.

Election results

2021 election

2017 election

2013 election

2009 election

Notes

References

Federal electoral districts in Hamburg
1980 establishments in West Germany
Constituencies established in 1980